"Hung Up" is a 2005 song by Madonna.

Hung Up may also refer to:

Hung Up (film), a 1973 French film directed by Édouard Luntz
"Hung Up" (Paul Weller song), a 1994 song
"Hung Up", a song by Hot Chelle Rae
"Hung Up", a 2006 song by Black Wire
"Hung Up", a 2009 song by The Cheek

See also
Hang up (disambiguation)